Lioux (Liuç in Occitan) is a commune in the Vaucluse department in the Provence-Alpes-Côte d'Azur region in southeastern France.

See also
Communes of the Vaucluse department
Luberon

References

Communes of Vaucluse